"Veterana" is a song by Bachata singers Elvis Martínez and Prince Royce. The song was released on December 2, 2021. The music video premiered on the same day as its audio release.

Charts

Weekly charts

References

2021 songs
2021 singles
Prince Royce songs
Sony Music Latin singles
Songs written by Prince Royce
Spanish-language songs